Geraldine Heng is Mildred Hajek Vacek and John Roman Vacek Chair in English and Comparative Literature (formerly Perceval Professor) at the University of Texas at Austin, where, as of November 2022, she was also affiliated with Middle Eastern studies, Women’s studies, Jewish Studies, and the Rapoport Center for Human Rights and Social Justice. Heng's work focuses on literary, social and cultural encounters between societies in the period 500–1500 CE. She is noted as a key figure in the development of postcolonial approaches to the European Middle Ages, premodern critical race studies, and critical early global studies.

Education and career 
Heng took her doctoral degree at Cornell University, completing her PhD thesis, Gender Magic: Desire, Romance, and the Feminine in Sir Gawain and the Green Knight, in 1990.

Heng coedits the Cambridge University Press Elements series in the Global Middle Ages, and the University of Pennsylvania Press series, RaceB4Race: Critical Studies of the Premodern. She is also noted for the article 'State Fatherhood: The Politics of Nationalism, Sexuality, and Race in Singapore', co-written with her husband Janadas Devan, critiquing social eugenics in Singapore. Among her various keynotes and plenaries, Heng was the keynote speaker at the 46th Annual New England Medieval Conference, 3 December 2020. Her talk was entitled 'The Politics of Race in the European Middle Ages'.

Books
 (ed.) Teaching the Global Middle Ages New York: Modern Language Association of America, 2022. 
The Global Middle Ages: An Introduction. Cambridge: Cambridge University Press, 2021. 
England and the Jews: How Religion and Violence Created the First Racial State in the West. Cambridge: Cambridge University Press, 2019. 
The Invention of Race in the European Middle Ages. New York: Cambridge University Press, 2018. 
Empire of Magic: Medieval Romance and the Politics of Cultural Fantasy (New York: Columbia University Press, 2003, 2004, 2012),

Awards
Her book The Invention of Race in the European Middle Ages (2018) won four awards, including the American Academy of Religion award for excellence in historical studies, the Otto Gründler book prize, the Robert W. Hamilton Book Award grand prize, and the Association of American Publishers PROSE award for world history.

References

External links
 https://utexas.academia.edu/GeraldineHeng
 http://www.globalmiddleages.org/ (a project founded by Heng)
Listen to the opening lecture at the 'Race and Periodization' Symposium, September 2019: https://www.folger.edu/institute/scholarly-programs/race-periodization/geraldine-heng

Living people
Cornell University alumni
Place of birth missing (living people)
Nationality missing
University of Texas at Austin faculty
National University of Singapore alumni
American academics of English literature
Middle Eastern studies scholars
Women's studies academics
American women historians
American medievalists
21st-century American historians
20th-century American historians
20th-century American women
21st-century American women
Year of birth missing (living people)